"Slippin' and Slidin' (Peepin' and Hidin')" is a R&B/rock 'n' roll song performed by Little Richard. The song is credited to Little Richard, Edwin Bocage (Eddie Bo), Al Collins, and James Smith.

Al Collins first recorded "I Got the Blues for You" in 1955.  Eddie Bo wrote new lyrics and adapted the song in 1956 under the name "I'm Wise". Bo's recording was released by the Apollo label. Little Richard recorded it the same year, and changed the title to "Slippin' and Slidin. His version is on his first album, Here's Little Richard. He recorded several versions for Specialty until the February, 1956 version was chosen as the B-side to "Long Tall Sally". Richard re-recorded the song for Vee Jay in 1964 and Modern in 1965 (live). Another version appeared on a Modern single, #1030, believed to be a studio leftover from Vee Jay.

"Slippin' and Slidin was the title of a song written by Maxwell Davis and performed by Calvin Boze and His All Stars, and released in May 1951 by Aladdin Records (3086). The song was described as "an engaging set of novelty lyrics, while combo puts down a swingy, medium shuffle". Over a year earlier, this song had been recorded by Gene Phillips - Jack McVea, and released on Modern (20-733). It was a fast blues with Phillips delivering in a Louis Jordan-like style.  A version by J. Lewis and Trio was released on Atlantic (927) in early 1951.

Personnel
Little Richard – vocals, piano
Lee Allen – tenor sax
Alvin "Red" Tyler – baritone sax
Frank Fields – bass
Earl Palmer – drums
Edgar Blanchard – guitar

Cover versions
 The song was covered by Dickie Pride in 1959.
 The Rivingtons recorded a cover on their debut 1962 Liberty album Doin' the Bird. They also included "Long Tall Sally" on this album.
 The song was covered by Buddy Holly on his album Reminiscing, and both his and the Little Richard versions were included on John Lennon's jukebox.
 The Beatles jammed a version at Twickenham during the Get Back sessions (Sulpy and Schweighardt 9.94). After their break-up, John Lennon recorded his version of the song for his 1975 album Rock 'n' Roll and on The Old Grey Whistle Test in April 1975. A few days later, he also played the song on the TV show in tribute to Sir Lew Grade (Salute to Sir Lew) on April 18, 1975.
 Otis Redding, from his album Tell the Truth, recorded in 1967 and released posthumously in 1970.
 Billy "Crash" Craddock in 1973 on his album Mr. Country Rock.
 Buddy Holly on his 1963 posthumous album Reminiscing.

References 

Rhythm and blues songs
Little Richard songs
Billy "Crash" Craddock songs
Buddy Holly songs
Songs about New Orleans
Songs written by Little Richard
1956 songs
Song recordings produced by Robert Blackwell
The Crickets songs